Abelson's paradox is an applied statistics paradox identified by Robert P. Abelson. The paradox pertains to a possible paradoxical relationship between the magnitude of the r2 (i.e., coefficient of determination) effect size and its practical meaning.

Abelson's example was obtained from the analysis of the r2 of batting average in baseball and skill level. Although batting average is considered among the most significant characteristics necessary for success, the effect size was only a tiny 0.003.

See also 
 List of paradoxes

References 

Statistical paradoxes